The 1976–77 NHL season was the 60th season of the National Hockey League. The Kansas City Scouts moved to Denver, Colorado, and became the Colorado Rockies and the California Golden Seals moved to Cleveland, Ohio, and became the Cleveland Barons. The Montreal Canadiens once again dominated the playoffs as, for the second straight year, they swept their opponent four games to none in the final series for the Stanley Cup.

League business
Two teams relocated: The Kansas City Scouts moved to Denver, Colorado, and became the Colorado Rockies and the California Golden Seals moved to Cleveland, Ohio, and became the Cleveland Barons. These were the first franchise moves since the original Ottawa Senators had relocated in 1934 to become the St. Louis Eagles. Instability and the poor performances of the Washington Capitals and the Scouts since the 1974 expansion caused the league to shelve an expansion to Denver and Seattle that had been proposed for this season. Seattle would not have a team until the expansion Seattle Kraken in the 2021–22 season.

This season was Clarence Campbell's last as NHL President. He would be succeeded by John Ziegler.

Regular season
The previous season saw the Montreal Canadiens set new records in wins and points. Both of those records were broken again by the Canadiens this season as, with the highest points percentage in post-expansion NHL history (.825), they had 60 wins and 132 points. Their home record was 33 wins, 1 loss, and 6 ties.  Scoring two hundred goals more than they allowed, the Canadiens were a full 20 points ahead of the second-place Philadelphia Flyers.  The Flyers, however, were swept in four straight games by the third-place Boston Bruins in the semi-finals. The Bruins were in turn swept by the Canadiens in four straight in the finals.

On February 2, 1977, Toronto Maple Leafs defenceman Ian Turnbull became the first player in NHL history to score five goals on five shots.

Final standings
Prince of Wales Conference

Clarence Campbell Conference

Playoffs
The New York Islanders won six consecutive games before the semifinal and were the only team from the preliminary round to make it to the semifinals, where they lost to the first-ranked, defending champion and eventual champion Montreal Canadiens. The Canadiens swept the St. Louis Blues, dispatched the Islanders in six to reach the final. The losses to the Islanders were the Canadiens' only losses of their playoff run. Second-ranked Philadelphia Flyers defeated the Toronto Maple Leafs in the quarterfinals, before being swept by the third-ranked Boston Bruins in the semifinals.

Playoff structure
For the 1977 playoffs, the top three teams in each division were awarded playoff berths. These twelve teams were then ranked 1–12 according to their regular season records, regardless of divisional affiliation. The four division winners automatically qualified for the quarterfinals, while the remaining eight teams (2nd and 3rd place teams in each division) played a preliminary round. For the preliminary round, the best non-division winner played the twelfth-ranked team, the second-best non-division winner played the eleventh-ranked team, the third ranked non-division winner played the third-lowest ranked non-division winner. (This did not necessarily have to be the tenth-ranked team, as it was possible for a tenth-ranked team to win its division. In fact, St. Louis did win the Smythe Division as the tenth-ranked playoff team.) The remaining two non-division winners formed the final preliminary round pairing. The preliminary round consisted of a best-of-three series with game one played  on the home ice of the higher-ranked team, and game two on the home ice of the lower-ranked team. If a deciding game three was necessary, it was played on the home ice of the higher-ranked team.

For the quarterfinal, semifinal, and the Stanley Cup Finals, each series was a best-of-seven, with home-ice advantage in games 1, 2, 5, and 7 (if necessary) going to the team with the better regular season record. The other team hosted games 3, 4, and 6 (if necessary). The four preliminary round winners joined the four division winners for the quarterfinals. The matchups were determined according to regular season records regardless to divisional affiliations. Of the eight remaining teams, the top-ranked team played the lowest-ranked remaining team, the second-highest-ranked remaining team played the second-lowest-ranked remaining team, and so on. The four quarterfinal winners advanced to the semifinals, with the match-ups again are reseeded by regular season records. The highest-ranked remaining team played the lowest-ranked remaining team, and the other two teams formed the second semifinal. The two semifinal winners played each other in the Stanley Cup Finals.

Playoff seeds

The twelve teams that qualified for the playoffs are ranked 1–12 based on regular season points.

Note: Only teams that qualified for the playoffs are listed here.

 Montreal Canadiens, Norris Division champions, Prince of Wales Conference regular season champions – 132 points
 Philadelphia Flyers, Patrick Division champions, Clarence Campbell Conference regular season champions – 112 points
 Boston Bruins, Adams Division champions – 106 points (49 wins)
 New York Islanders – 106 points (47 wins)
 Buffalo Sabres – 104 points
 Los Angeles Kings – 83 points
 Pittsburgh Penguins – 81 points (34 wins)
 Toronto Maple Leafs – 81 points (33 wins)
 Atlanta Flames – 80 points
 St. Louis Blues, Smythe Division champions – 73 points
 Minnesota North Stars – 64 points
 Chicago Black Hawks – 63 points

Playoff bracket

 Division winners earned a bye to the Quarterfinals
 Teams were re-seeded based on regular season record after the Preliminary and Quarterfinal rounds

Preliminary round

(1) New York Islanders vs. (8) Chicago Black Hawks

This was the first playoff series meeting between these two teams. The Black Hawks were originally scheduled as the home team for the second game, but its home rink Chicago Stadium had already been booked that night for the second of three Led Zeppelin concerts.

(2) Buffalo Sabres vs. (7) Minnesota North Stars

This was the first playoff series meeting between these two teams.

(3) Los Angeles Kings vs. (6) Atlanta Flames

This was the second playoff series meeting between these two teams. This was a rematch of last year's Preliminary Round, in which Los Angeles won in a two-game sweep.

(4) Pittsburgh Penguins vs. (5) Toronto Maple Leafs

This was the second playoff series meeting between these two teams. This was a rematch of last year's Preliminary Round, in which Toronto won the series 2–1.

Quarterfinals

(1) Montreal Canadiens vs. (8) St. Louis Blues

This was the third playoff series meeting between these two teams. Montreal won both previous meetings in four-game sweeps in both the 1968 & 1969 Stanley Cup Finals.

(2) Philadelphia Flyers vs. (7) Toronto Maple Leafs

This was the third playoff series meeting between these two teams. Philadelphia won both previous meetings in the last two seasons. The latter of which Philadelphia won in seven games in last year's Stanley Cup Quarterfinals.

(3) Boston Bruins vs. (6) Los Angeles Kings

This was the second playoff series meeting between these two teams. This was a rematch of last year's Stanley Cup Quarterfinals, in which Boston won in seven games.

(4) New York Islanders vs. (5) Buffalo Sabres

This was the second playoff series meeting between these two teams. This was a rematch of last year's Stanley Cup Quarterfinals, in which New York won in six games.

Semifinals

(1) Montreal Canadiens vs. (4) New York Islanders

This was the second playoff series meeting between these two teams. This was a rematch of last year's Stanley Cup Semifinals, in which Montreal won in five games.

(2) Philadelphia Flyers vs. (3) Boston Bruins

This was the third playoff series meeting between these two teams. Philadelphia won both previous meetings. This was a rematch of last year's Stanley Cup Semifinals, in which Philadelphia won in five games.

Stanley Cup Finals

This was the 16th playoff series meeting between these two teams. Montreal lead 13–2 in previous meetings. They last met in the 1971 Stanley Cup Quarterfinals, in which Montreal upset Boston in seven games.

The defending champion Montreal Canadiens took on the "Original Six" rival, the third-ranked Boston Bruins in the Finals. Both teams had swept a series and had lost only two games in the earlier rounds. The Canadiens swept the series in four games to win their second consecutive Stanley Cup.

Awards

All-Star teams

Player statistics

Scoring leaders
GP = Games Played, G = Goals, A = Assists, Pts = Points, PIM = Penalties In Minutes

Source: NHL.

Leading goaltenders

Note: GP = Games played; Min = Minutes played; GA = Goals against; GAA = Goals against average; W = Wins; L = Losses; T = Ties; SO = Shutouts

Coaches

Patrick Division
Atlanta Flames: Fred Creighton
New York Islanders: Al Arbour
New York Rangers: John Ferguson, Sr.
Philadelphia Flyers: Fred Shero

Adams Division
Boston Bruins: Don Cherry
Buffalo Sabres: Floyd Smith
Cleveland Barons: Jack Evans
Toronto Maple Leafs: Red Kelly

Norris Division
Detroit Red Wings: Larry Wilson
Los Angeles Kings: Bob Pulford
Montreal Canadiens: Scotty Bowman
Pittsburgh Penguins: Ken Schinkel
Washington Capitals: Tom McVie

Smythe Division
Chicago Black Hawks: Billy Reay and Bill White
Colorado Rockies: Johnny Wilson
Minnesota North Stars: Ted Harris
St. Louis Blues: Emile Francis
Vancouver Canucks: Phil Maloney and Orland Kurtenbach

Debuts
The following is a list of players of note who played their first NHL game in 1976–77 (listed with their first team, asterisk(*) marks debut in playoffs):
Mike Palmateer, Toronto Maple Leafs
Don Edwards, Buffalo Sabres
Bob Sauve, Buffalo Sabres
Reed Larson, Detroit Red Wings
Brian Engblom*, Montreal Canadiens
Don Murdoch, New York Rangers
Bernie Federko, St. Louis Blues
Brian Sutter, St. Louis Blues
Randy Carlyle, Toronto Maple Leafs
Rick Green, Washington Capitals

Last games
The following is a list of players of note that played their last game in the NHL in 1976–77 (listed with their last team):
Pat Quinn, Atlanta Flames
Gilles Villemure, Chicago Black Hawks
Jim Pappin, Cleveland Barons
Simon Nolet, Colorado Rockies
Bob Berry, Los Angeles Kings
Ed Van Impe, Pittsburgh Penguins
Vic Hadfield, Pittsburgh Penguins
Barclay Plager, St. Louis Blues
Roger Crozier, Washington Capitals

See also 
 List of Stanley Cup champions
 1976 NHL Amateur Draft
 1976–77 NHL transactions
 1976 Canada Cup
 30th National Hockey League All-Star Game
 National Hockey League All-Star Game
 1976–77 WHA season
 1976 in sports
 1977 in sports

References
 
 
 
 

Notes

External links
Hockey Database
NHL.com

 
1976–77 in Canadian ice hockey by league
1976–77 in American ice hockey by league